Peroxisomal membrane protein PEX13 is a protein that in humans is encoded by the PEX13 gene. It located on chromosome 2 next to KIAA1841

Interactions 

PEX13 has been shown to interact with PEX14, PEX5 and PEX19.

References

Further reading

External links 
  GeneReviews/NCBI/NIH/UW entry on Peroxisome Biogenesis Disorders, Zellweger Syndrome Spectrum
 OMIM entries on Peroxisome Biogenesis Disorders, Zellweger Syndrome Spectrum